Parit (Jawi: ڤاريت) is a main town of Perak Tengah District, Perak, Malaysia.

List of Schools in Parit:-
Primary schools:
 Sekolah Rendah Kebangsaan Parit (SRKP).
 Sekolah Rendah Kebangsaan Iskandar Shah (SRKIS).
 Sekolah Jenis Kebangsaan (C) Chung Hwa.

Secondary schools:
 Sekolah Menengah Kebangsaan Iskandar Shah (SMKIS).
 Sekolah Menengah Kebangsaan Sultan Muhammad Shah (SMKSMS).
 Maktab Rendah Sains MARA, Parit, Perak

Secondary religious school:
 Sekolah Menengah Agama Aziziah

Notable residents 
Abdullah CD, Communist guerrilla leader, born in Parit

References

Perak Tengah District
Towns in Perak